Torpedo Pesado Nacional (English: National Heavyweight Torpedo) TPNer also known as TP-1, is a Brazilian heavyweight anti-submarine warfare torpedo under development by the Brazilian defense company Mectron S.A. and the Brazilian Navy.

Development
The project of the first Brazilian national torpedo was conceived in 2015 by Mectron, a subsidiary of the Brazilian conglomerate Novonor, together with the anti-ship missile Mansup AV-RE40, aiming to meet the strategic needs of the Brazilian Armed Forces modernization program. The Navy intends to use the TPNer as the armament of the Scorpéne-class SSKs and Álvaro Alberto-class SSNs.

See also

List of torpedoes
F21 Artemis a French heavyweight torpedo
Mark 48 an American heavyweight torpedo
Stingray a British lightweight torpedo

References

External links
Mectron/SIATT
Brazilian Navy Site

Torpedoes
Torpedoes of Brazil
Naval weapons of Brazil